Guilherme Afonso Noé (5 April 1992 – 24 January 2021) was a Brazilian footballer. He died in the 2021 Palmas FR plane crash.

Career statistics
Source:

Notes

References

1992 births
2021 deaths
Brazilian footballers
Association football midfielders
Campeonato Brasileiro Série C players
Campeonato Brasileiro Série D players
Sport Club Corinthians Paulista players
Grêmio Osasco Audax Esporte Clube players
Sport Club Internacional players
Audax Rio de Janeiro Esporte Clube players
Tombense Futebol Clube players
Tupi Football Club players
Mirassol Futebol Clube players
Batatais Futebol Clube players
Associação Atlética Caldense players
Rio Preto Esporte Clube players
São Bernardo Futebol Clube players
Ipatinga Futebol Clube players
Palmas Futebol e Regatas players
Nacional Atlético Clube (SP) players
Esporte Clube Democrata players
Victims of aviation accidents or incidents in Brazil
Victims of aviation accidents or incidents in 2021
Footballers from São Paulo (state)